Federica Bigi is a Sammarinese diplomat and politician. As of 2009, she is San Marino's Minister for Foreign and Political Affairs. She had previously served as San Marino's Ambassador and Permanent Representative to the United Nations Office at Geneva, and as Ambassador of San Marino to Latvia.

Bigi speaks fluent French.

References

Year of birth missing (living people)
Living people
Permanent Representatives of San Marino to the United Nations
Ambassadors of San Marino to Latvia
21st-century women politicians
21st-century diplomats
Sammarinese women ambassadors
Secretaries of State for Foreign and Political Affairs of San Marino
Female foreign ministers
Women government ministers of San Marino
Sammarinese women diplomats